Aloe haworthioides is a species of plant in the genus Aloe native to Madagascar. This aloe is named for its leaves, which are covered with soft spines that create a resemblance to Haworthia species. A small species, it grows in stemless, clumping offsets and sports orange, highly fragrant flowers.

References

External links

Endemic flora of Madagascar
haworthioides
Taxa named by John Gilbert Baker
Plants described in 1887